The Oplotniščica or Oplotnica is a river in Styria, Slovenia. Its source is on the Pohorje Massif, northeast of Mount Rogla. It passes Osankarica, Lukanja, and Cezlak, runs through Oplotnica and Tepanje, and then merges with the Dravinja near Žiče.

References

Rivers of Styria (Slovenia)